Silhouettes is the forty-fifth album by Klaus Schulze, released on 25 May 2018.

Track listing
All tracks composed by Klaus Schulze.

References

External links
 Silhouettes at the official site of Klaus Schulze
 Silhouettes (Klaus Schulze album) at Discogs
 AllMusic

2018 albums
Klaus Schulze albums
Ambient albums by German artists
Trance albums